Vlad Yudin (born 26 October 1982) is a Russian filmmaker. He is best known for his work in the United States, where he has made documentaries about topics such as hip-hop music, bodybuilding, and MMA.

Filmography
Big Fun: The Legacy (2008) 
Last Day of Summer (2009)
Mr Immortality: The Life and Times of Twista (2011)
Generation Iron (2013)
Catskill Park (2014)
Own3d (2014)
Jeremy Scott: The People's Designer (2015)
CT Fletcher: My Magnificent Obsession (2015)
The Hurt Business (2016)
Generation Iron 2 (2017)
Generation Iron 3 (2018)
Ronnie Coleman: The King (2018)
Enhanced (2019)

As a producer only 
Police State (2014)
Head Smash (2014)

Bibliography
Head Smash (2013, Arcana Studio)

References

External links

1982 births
Living people
Russian film directors